Attawapiskat Airport  is an airport adjacent to the Attawapiskat First Nation in Ontario, Canada.

Facilities

A small building at the airport provides office space. There are no hangars, and aircraft are parked in the apron area off the runway. Limited parking is located next to the airport building.

Airlines and destinations

Note: Other private small airplanes/airlines (e.g. Wabusk Air, Bushland Airways Ltd., Wasaya Airways) provide services or cargo to Attawapiskat and other locations only. Air Creebec offers fixed wing air ambulance transfer to Ontario or Quebec. Thunder Air is an air ambulance contractor with ORNGE.

References

External links
 Page about this airport on COPA's "Places to Fly" airport directory
 

Certified airports in Kenora District